Karl Kuhn is an American college baseball coach and former catcher, who is the current pitching coach for the Charleston Southern Buccaneers. Kuhn played college baseball at Valencia Community College from 1987 to 1989 and at the University of Florida in 1990 for head coach Joe Arnold. He then served as the head coach of the Radford Highlanders (2020–2022).

Playing career
Kuhn attended Buchholz High School in Gainesville, Florida. He then enrolled at Valencia Community College, to play college baseball for the Matadors. After three years at Valencia, Kuhn played his final college season playing at the University of Florida.

Coaching career
On August 22, 2019, Kuhn was named the head baseball coach at Radford University. On June 3, 2022, Kuhn resigned as the head coach of the Highlanders amidst an investigation by the university's human resources department.

Head coaching record

References

External links
 Karl Kuhn at The Baseball Cube
 Radford Highlanders bio

Living people
1969 births
Baseball catchers
Valencia Matadors baseball players
Florida Gators baseball players
High school baseball coaches in the United States
Valencia Matadors baseball coaches
Charleston Southern Buccaneers baseball coaches
Little Rock Trojans baseball coaches
Virginia Cavaliers baseball coaches
Radford Highlanders baseball coaches